David Matthew Claire (November 17, 1897 – January 7, 1956) was an American Major League Baseball shortstop who played in three games for the Detroit Tigers in .

External links

1897 births
1956 deaths
Detroit Tigers players
Major League Baseball shortstops
Baseball players from Michigan